Spoilers of the Range is a 1939 American Western film directed by Charles C. Coleman and starring Charles Starrett.

Plot
Hero Jeff Strong (Starrett) comes to the rescue of a group of victimized ranchers. The villains are a gang of crooked gamblers, who demand a valuable dam as payment for a $50,000 debt. The ranchers hope to earn the money by getting their cattle to market on time, but head bad guy Cash Fenton (Kenneth MacDonald) and his flunkey Lobo (Dick Curtis) intend to prevent this.

Cast
 Charles Starrett as Jeff Strong 
 Iris Meredith as Madge Patterson
 Sons of the Pioneers as Musicians 
 Dick Curtis as Lobo Savage
 Kenneth MacDonald as Cash Fenton 
 Hank Bell as Sheriff Hank
 Bob Nolan as Bob
 Edward LeSaint as Dan Patterson
 Forbes Murray as David Rowland
 Art Mix as Santos - Henchman
 Edmund Cobb as Kendall - Rancher
 Edward Peil Sr. as Harper - Rancher

References

External links
 

1939 films
American Western (genre) films
1939 Western (genre) films
Films directed by Charles C. Coleman
American black-and-white films
Columbia Pictures films
1930s American films